Shorea woodii is a tree in the family Dipterocarpaceae, native to Borneo. It is named for the botanist Geoffrey Wood.

Description
The bark is smooth at first, becoming fissured.

Distribution and habitat
Shorea woodii is endemic to Borneo, where it is confined to Sarawak. Its habitat is lowland mixed dipterocarp forests.

Conservation
Shorea woodii has been assessed as endangered on the IUCN Red List. It is threatened by land conversion for plantations. It is also threatened by logging for its timber. Shorea woodii does occur in one protected area: Bukit Mersing National Park.

References

woodii
Endemic flora of Borneo
Flora of Sarawak
Plants described in 2004